Leonid Danylovych Kuchma (born 9 August 1938) is a Ukrainian politician who was the second president of Ukraine from 19 July 1994 to 23 January 2005. Kuchma's presidency saw numerous corruption scandals and the lessening of media freedoms.

After a successful career in the machine-building industry of the Soviet Union, Kuchma began his political career in 1990, when he was elected to the Verkhovna Rada (the Ukrainian parliament); he was re-elected in 1994. He served as Prime Minister of Ukraine between October 1992 and September 1993.

Kuchma took office after winning the 1994 presidential election against his rival, incumbent President Leonid Kravchuk. Kuchma won re-election for an additional five-year term in 1999. Corruption accelerated after Kuchma's election in 1994, but in 2000–2001, his power began to weaken in the face of exposures in the media. Kuchma's administration began a campaign of media censorship in 1999, leading to arrests of journalists, the death of Georgiy Gongadze, and the subsequent Cassette Scandal and mass protests. The Ukrainian economy continued to decline until 1999, whereas growth was recorded since 2000, bringing relative prosperity to some segments of urban residents. During his presidency, Ukrainian-Russian ties began to improve.

Kuchma declined to seek a third term in office, instead supporting Party of Regions candidate Viktor Yanukovych for the 2004 election. Following public protests over the alleged electoral fraud which escalated into the Orange Revolution, Kuchma took a neutral stance and was a mediator between Viktor Yushchenko and Viktor Yanukovych. Between 2014 and 2020, Kuchma was a special presidential representative of Ukraine at the semi-official peace talks regarding the ongoing War in Donbas.

Kuchma's legacy has proven controversial, and he has been described as authoritarian by various sources. Widespread corruption and media censorship under Kuchma's administration continue to have an impact on Ukraine today, and he has been accused of promoting oligarchism.

Early life
Leonid Danylovych Kuchma was born in the village of Chaikyne in rural Chernihiv Oblast on 9 August 1938. His father, Danylo Prokopovych Kuchma (1901–1942) was wounded in World War II and eventually died of his wounds in the field hospital #756 (near the village of Novoselytsia) when Leonid was four. His mother Paraska Trokhymivna Kuchma worked on a kolkhoz.

Kuchma attended the Kostobobriv general education school in the neighboring Semenivka Raion. Later he enrolled in Dnipropetrovsk National University and graduated in 1960 with a degree in mechanical engineering (majoring in aerospace engineering). In 1960 joined the Communist Party of Soviet Union. Kuchma is a candidate of technical sciences.

In 1967, Kuchma married Lyudmyla Talalayeva.

Career
After graduation, Kuchma worked in the field of aerospace engineering for the Yuzhnoye Design Bureau in Dnipropetrovsk. At 28 he became a testing director for the Bureau deployed at the Baikonur cosmodrome.

Some political observers suggested that Kuchma's early career was significantly boosted by his marriage to Lyudmila Talalayeva, an adopted daughter of Gennadiy Tumanov, the Yuzhmash chief engineering officer and later the Soviet Minister of Medium Machine Building.

At 38 Kuchma became the Communist party chief at Yuzhny Machine-building Plant and a member of the Central Committee of the Communist Party of Ukraine. He was a delegate of the 27th and 28th Congresses of the Communist Party of Soviet Union. By the end of the 1980s, Kuchma openly criticized the Communist Party.

In 1982 Kuchma was appointed the first deputy of general design engineer at Yuzhmash, and from 1986 to 1992, he held the position of the company's general director. From 1990 to 1992, Kuchma was a member of the Verkhovna Rada (Ukraine's parliament). In 1992 he was appointed as Prime Minister of Ukraine. He resigned a year later, complaining of "slow pace of reform". He was re-elected into parliament in 1994.

President (1994–2005)

Kuchma resigned from the position of Prime Minister of Ukraine in September 1993 to run for the presidency in 1994 on a platform to boost the economy by restoring economic relations with Russia and faster pro-market reforms. Kuchma won a clear victory against the incumbent President Leonid Kravchuk, receiving strong support from the industrial areas in the east and south. His worst results were in the west of the country.

Kuchma was re-elected in 1999 to his second term. This time the areas that gave him strongest support last time voted for his opponents, and the areas which voted against him last time came to his support.

During Kuchma's presidency, he closed opposition papers and several journalists and political opponents, such as Viacheslav Chornovil, died in mysterious circumstances. According to historian Serhy Yekelchyk, President Kuchma's administration "employed electoral fraud freely" during the 2000 constitutional referendum and 1999 presidential elections.

Domestic policy
In October 1994, Kuchma announced comprehensive economic reforms, including reduced subsidies, lifting of price controls, lower taxes, privatization of industry and agriculture, and reforms in currency regulation and banking. The parliament approved the plan's main points. The International Monetary Fund (IMF) promised a $360 million loan to initiate reforms. 

He was re-elected in 1999 to his second term. Opponents accused him of involvement in the killing in 2000 of journalist Georgiy Gongadze, but Kuchma has consistently denied such claims. Critics have also blamed Kuchma for restrictions on press freedom. Kuchma is believed to have played a key role in sacking the Cabinet of Viktor Yushchenko by Verkhovna Rada on 26 April 2001.

Kuchma's Prime Minister from 2002 until early January 2005 was Viktor Yanukovych, after Kuchma dismissed Anatoliy Kinakh, his previous appointee.

Foreign policy

In 2002, Kuchma stated that Ukraine wanted to sign an association agreement with the European Union by 2003–2004 and that Ukraine would meet all EU membership requirements by 2007–2011. He also hoped for a free trade treaty with the EU.

In his inaugural address, Kuchma said:

Kuchma signed a "Treaty of Friendship, Cooperation, and Partnership" with Russia, and endorsed a round of talks with the CIS. Additionally, he referred to Russian as "an official language". He signed a special partnership agreement with NATO and raised the possibility of membership of the alliance. Under Kuchma's leadership, the Armed Forces of Ukraine participated in the Iraq War.

After Kuchma's popularity at home and abroad sank as he became mired in corruption scandals, he turned to Russia as his new ally. From the late 1990s he adopted a foreign policy which he described as "multi-vector", reaching out to Russia, Europe, and the United States. Critics assessed this policy as manipulating both the West and Russia to the personal benefit of Kuchma and Ukrainian oligarchs.

On 4 October 2001, Siberia Airlines Flight 1812 was shot down over the Black Sea by the Ukrainian Air Force while en route to Novosibirsk, Russia, from Tel Aviv, Israel. All 78 occupants of the plane, most of whom were Israelis visiting relatives in Russia, were killed. Following the shootdown, Kuchma initially refused to accept the resignation of Oleksandr Kuzmuk, Minister of Defence of Ukraine, and said, "Look what is happening around the world, in Europe. We are not the first, and we will not be the last. There is no need to make a tragedy out of this. Mistakes happen everywhere, and not only on this scale, but on a much larger, planetary scale." A week later, however, Kuchma announced his willingness to cooperate with Russian investigators, apologised to the governments of Russia and Israel, and accepted Kuzmuk's resignation.

Murder of Georgiy Gongadze and Cassette Scandal

From 1998 to 2000, Kuchma's bodyguard Mykola Melnychenko was allegedly eavesdropping Kuchma's office, later publishing the recordings. The release of the tapes – dubbed the Cassette Scandal – supposedly revealed Kuchma's numerous crimes. In particular was his approving the sale of radar systems to Saddam Hussein (among other illegal arms sales) and ordering the death of journalist Georgiy Gongadze.

In September 2000, Gongadze disappeared and his headless corpse was found mutilated on 3 November 2000. On 28 November, opposition politician Oleksandr Moroz publicised the tape recordings implicating Kuchma in Gongadze's murder. In 2005, the Ukrainian Prosecutor General's office instigated criminal proceedings against Kuchma and members of his former administration in connection with the murder of Gongadze. In 2005, the press reported that Kuchma had been unofficially granted immunity from prosecution in return for his graceful departure from office in 2005.

Critics of the tapes point to the difficulty of Melnychenko recording 500 hours of dictaphone tape unaided and undetected, the lack of material evidence of said recording equipment, and other doubts which question the authenticity and motive of the release of the tape. Kuchma acknowledged in 2003 that his voice was one of those on the tapes, but claimed the tapes had been selectively edited to distort his meaning.

However, the United States ambassador to Ukraine, Carlos Pascual, revealed that the tapes are genuine, undistorted, unaltered, and not manipulated because of the conclusion from FBI Electronic Research Facility's analysis of the original recording device and the original recording found that there are not unusual sounds which would indicate a tampering of the recording, the recording is continuous with no breaks, and there is no manipulation of the digital files.

The Prosecutor-General of Ukraine's Office cancelled its resolution to deny opening of criminal cases against Kuchma and other politicians within the Gongadze-case on 9 October 2010. On 22 March 2011, Ukraine opened an official investigation into the murder of Gongadze and, two days later, Ukrainian prosecutors charged Kuchma with involvement in the murder. A Ukrainian district court ordered prosecutors to drop criminal charges against Kuchma on 14 December 2011 on grounds that evidence linking him to the murder of Gongadze was insufficient. The court rejected Melnychenko's recordings as evidence. Gongadze's widow, Myroslava Gongadze, lodged an appeal against the ruling one week later.

During the trial of Oleksiy Pukach for the murder of Gongadze, he claimed that Kuchma and Kuchma's head of his Presidential Administration, Volodymyr Lytvyn, were the ones who ordered the murder. Pukach was convicted and sentenced to life imprisonment for his part in the murder of Gongadze.

First Deputy Prosecutor General of Ukraine Renat Kuzmin claimed 20 February 2013 that his office had collected enough evidence confirming Kuchma's responsibility for ordering Gongadze's assassination. Kuchma's reply the next day was, "This is another banal example of a provocation, which I've heard more than enough in the past 12 years".

2004 Ukrainian presidential election and Orange Revolution

Kuchma's role in the 2004 Ukrainian presidential election and subsequent Orange Revolution is not entirely clear. In the run-up to the elections, oligarchs opposed to Leonid Kuchma contributed about $150 million to opposition political parties. According to Michael McFaul, U.S. ambassador to Russia from 2012 to 2014 and architect of Barack Obama's policy in the region, the U.S. government spent more than $18 million on "democracy promotion" in the two years leading up to the election. After the second round on 22 November 2004, it appeared that Yanukovych had won the election by fraud, which caused the opposition and independent observers to dispute the results, leading to the Orange Revolution.

Kuchma was urged by Yanukovych and Viktor Medvedchuk (the head of the presidential office) to declare a state of emergency and hold the inauguration of Yanukovych. He denied the request. Later, Yanukovych publicly accused Kuchma of a betrayal. Kuchma refused to officially dismiss Prime Minister Yanukovych after the parliament passed a motion of no confidence against the Cabinet on 1 December 2004. Soon after, Kuchma left the country. He returned to Ukraine in March 2005.

Kuchma said in October 2009 that he would vote for Victor Yanukovych in the 2010 Ukrainian presidential election. In a document dated 2 February 2010 and uncovered during the United States diplomatic cables leak, Kuchma, in a conversation with United States Ambassador to Ukraine John F. Tefft, called the voters' choice between Yanukovych and Yulia Tymoshenko during the second round of the 2010 presidential election as a choice between "bad and very bad" and praised (the candidate eliminated in the first round of the election) Arseniy Yatsenyuk instead.

In September 2011, Kuchma stated that he believed that Yanukovych was the real winner of the 2004 election.

Post-presidency
Leonid Kuchma has been active in politics since his presidency ended. He aligned himself with President Viktor Yushchenko in 2005, but later raised concerns about the president in correspondence with then U.S. Ambassador to Ukraine, John Tefft. Kuchma endorsed Yanukovych for president in 2010.

Involvement in the 2014 pro-Russian conflict in Ukraine 

Kuchma represented Ukraine at negotiations with the armed separatists in the Donetsk and Luhansk provinces on 21 June 2014 to discuss President Petro Poroshenko's peace plan. His role as a diplomat was received positively by the west and Russia as well as by the public in Ukraine.

On 11 February 2015, Kuchma was one of the signatories of a draft plan to end the conflict in Donbas. The summit was known as Minsk II. The plan ensured that a ceasefire was implemented; reaction from leaders in Europe was generally positive.

In March 2015, Kuchma delivered an address calling on the west for greater involvement in the region. He criticized the action of Russian-backed forces in the attempt to seize the town of Debaltseve.

In September 2015, Kuchma was again appointed as the representative for Ukraine at the Trilateral Contact Group. The group met in Belarus to discuss ending the conflict in Donbas. In early 2017, Kuchma spoke out against the transport blockade of Donbas. In March 2017 at the Trilateral Contact Group (TCG) in Minsk, he demanded that the Russian Federation repeal their decree on the recognition of passports issued in separatist-held areas.

On 2 October 2018, Kuchma stepped down as Ukraine's representative in the Trilateral Contact Group due to his age. He returned to the talks in June 2019, at the request of newly elected Ukrainian president Volodymyr Zelenskyy and after mediation by Victor Pinchuk. According to American sources, he left the post again in July 2020, citing fatigue. He was replaced by Leonid Kravchuk.

Russo-Ukrainian War 

When Russia began its invasion of Ukraine in 2022, Kuchma said that he would remain to help defend the country: "I stay at home, in Ukraine, because we are all in our Homeland, there is no other. And we will defend it together until the very victory – without division into party columns, without personal interests and old arguments. United we stand around the Flag, the Army, and the President. Ukraine is not Russia. And it will never become Russia. No matter how hard they want this. We are already winning. And this can’t be stopped. And I will only say to the Russian Federation that I agree with the words of my compatriots who say in one voice: damn you all!".

Family and personal life

Leonid Kuchma has been married to Lyudmyla Kuchma since 1967. She is the Honorary President of the National Fund of Social Protection of Mothers and Children, "Ukraine to Children" and is also known as a paralympic movement in Ukraine supporter.

Kuchma's only child, daughter Olena Pinchuk, is married to Viktor Pinchuk, an industrialist and philanthropist whose Victor Pinchuk Foundation regularly hosts Ukraine-dedicated and philanthropic forums at the annual World Economic Forum in Davos. Olena Pinchuk has a son Roman (born in 1991, from her previous marriage with Ukrainian businessman Igor Franchuk) who attends Brown University, and two daughters with Viktor Pinchuk, Katerina (born in 2003) and Veronica (2011).

Olena Pinchuk founded the ANTIAIDS Foundation in 2003. According to the Ukrainian magazine Focus, Olena Pinchuk was amongst the "top 10 most influential women" in Ukraine as of 2010.

Victor Pinchuk made headlines when it was revealed that one of his lobbyists was previously picked by Donald Trump for national security aide.

Kuchma was an amateur guitar player in his younger years. He was also known for his skill at the complicated card game preferans.

In 2003, he published his book, .

After retirement, Kuchma was allowed to keep the state-owned dacha in Koncha-Zaspa for his personal use upon completion of his state duties. Government order #15-r, which allowed Kuchma to keep his estate, was signed by acting Prime Minister Mykola Azarov on 19 January 2005. Kuchma was also allowed to keep his full presidential salary and all service personnel, along with two state-owned vehicles. That order also stated that these costs would be paid out of the state budget.

Legacy 
Kuchma's legacy as President of Ukraine has proven divisive and controversial. He has been commonly referred to as authoritarian, and his attacks on independent media, as well as his economic reforms, have continued to impact Ukraine in the years since he left office.

Kuchma's detractors have accused him of establishing the Ukrainian oligarchs with his economic reforms, and many oligarchs entered politics during his presidency, among them Kuchma's son-in-law Viktor Pinchuk, Viktor Medvedchuk, Ihor Bakai, Kostyantyn Zhevago and Heorhiy Kirpa.

Kuchma's political legacy has also been impactful. Each of his successors except Volodymyr Zelenskyy began their political career under and with the support of Kuchma. Several other politicians, such as Medevdchuk, Volodymyr Lytvyn, Leonid Derkach, Volodymyr Horbulin, and Oleksandr Omelchenko also were promoted by Kuchma during his tenure in office.

Despite numerous human rights abuses during his tenure, such as vote rigging in the 2004 presidential election, and the mysterious deaths of numerous political opponents, among them Gongadze and Viacheslav Chornovil, Kuchma has never been charged with a crime, and numerous attempts to do so have proven unsuccessful.

Awards

Kuchma was awarded the Azerbaijani Istiglal Order for his contributions to Azerbaijan-Ukraine relations and strategic cooperation between the states by President of Azerbaijan Heydar Aliyev on 6 August 1999.

Ukrainian Honours
 Order of the Ukrainian Orthodox Church (Moscow Patriarchate) of St. Ilya of Murom, 1st class (2004)
 Honorary Citizen of the Donetsk Oblast (2002)

Foreign Honours
 Knight Grand Cross with Grand Cordon of the Order of Merit of the Italian Republic (3 May 1995)
 Knight Collar of the Order of Civil Merit (4 October 1996)
 Order of Merit for the Fatherland, 1st class (Russia, 20 April 2004) – for his contribution to strengthening friendship and cooperation between Russia and Ukraine
 Grand Cross of the Order of Vytautas the Great (Lithuania, 20 September 1996)
 Grand Cross of the Order of the Lithuanian Grand Duke Gediminas (Lithuania, 4 November 1998, Ludmila too)
 Order of the Golden Eagle (Kazakhstan, 1999)
 Order of the Republic (Moldova, 2003)
 Order Laila Utama Dardzha Kerabat, 1st class (Brunei, 2004)
 Chain of the Order of Prince Henry (Portugal, 16 April 1998) 3 February 1999
 Order of the "Star of Bethlehem" (State of Palestine, 2000)

Notes

References

Further reading
 Åslund, Anders, and Michael McFaul.Revolution in Orange: The Origins of Ukraine's Democratic Breakthrough. (2006)
 Aslund, Anders. How Ukraine Became a Market Economy and Democracy. (2009)
 Birch, Sarah. Elections and Democratization in Ukraine. (2000) online edition
 Kubicek, Paul. The History of Ukraine. (2008) excerpt and text search
 Kuzio, Taras. Ukraine: State and Nation Building (1998) online edition
 Sochor, Zenovia A. "Political Culture and Foreign Policy: Elections in Ukraine 1994." in: Tismăneanu, Vladmir (ed.). 1995. Political Culture and Civil Society in Russia and the New States of Eurasia. (1994) . pp. 208–224.
 Whitmore, Sarah. State Building in Ukraine: The Ukrainian Parliament, 1990–2003. Routledge, 2004 online edition
 Wilson, Andrew. Ukraine's Orange Revolution. (2005)
 Wilson, Andrew. The Ukrainians: Unexpected Nation. 2nd ed. 2002; online excerpts at Amazon
 Wolczuk, Roman. Ukraine's Foreign and Security Policy 1991–2000. (2002) excerpt and text search
 Zon, Hans van. The Political Economy of Independent Ukraine. 2000 online edition

External links

 Liudmyla Shanghina, "UKRAINE IS NOT AMERICA", Razumkov
 "Yushchenko Won the Competition of Personalities", (Kuchma's 2005 interview), Vremia Novostey (Russia) 
 Korzh, H. Leonid Kuchma: Real biography of the second President of Ukraine.
 

|-

 
1938 births
Living people
Leonid
People from Chernihiv Oblast
Presidents of Ukraine
Prime Ministers of Ukraine
Communist Party of the Soviet Union members
Communist Party of Ukraine (Soviet Union) politicians
Politicians of the Ukrainian Soviet Socialist Republic
Independent politicians in Ukraine
First convocation members of the Verkhovna Rada
Second convocation members of the Verkhovna Rada
Candidates in the 1994 Ukrainian presidential election
Candidates in the 1999 Ukrainian presidential election
Yuzhmash people
People of the Orange Revolution
2003 Tuzla Island conflict
Pro-Ukrainian people of the 2014 pro-Russian unrest in Ukraine
People of the Russo-Ukrainian War
Ukraine without Kuchma
Oles Honchar Dnipro National University alumni
Chevaliers of the Order of Merit (Ukraine)
Collars of the Order of Civil Merit
Knights Grand Cross with Collar of the Order of Merit of the Italian Republic
Laureates of the State Prize of Ukraine in Science and Technology
Lenin Prize winners
Grand Crosses of the Order of the Lithuanian Grand Duke Gediminas
Grand Collars of the Order of Prince Henry
Grand Crosses of the Order of Vytautas the Great
Recipients of the Istiglal Order
Recipients of the Order "For Merit to the Fatherland", 1st class
Recipients of the Order of Prince Yaroslav the Wise
Recipients of the Order of the Red Banner of Labour
Recipients of the Order of the Republic (Moldova)
Recipients of the Order of the Star of Romania
Recipients of the Order of the White Eagle (Poland)
20th-century Ukrainian politicians
21st-century Ukrainian politicians
20th-century Ukrainian businesspeople
21st-century Ukrainian businesspeople